The Coupe Nationale is the national knockout tournament for football clubs in the Central African Republic.

Winners
1974 : AS Tempête Mocaf
1975
1976 : Red Star
1977 : Sodiam Sports
1978 : TP USCA Bangui
1979 : Sodiam Sports
1980 : Anges de Fatima
1981 : Anges de Fatima
1982 : AS Tempête Mocaf
1983 : Avia Sports
1984 : Stade Centrafricain (SCAF Tocages)
1985 : AS Tempête Mocaf
1986
1987
1988 : TP USCA Bangui
1989 : Réal Olympique Castel
1990 : FACA
1991 : Anges de Fatima 6-2 Anges Makaron
1992 : AS Tempête Mocaf 1-1 Anges de Fatima
1993 : Anges de Fatima 3-2 Stade Centrafricain
1994 : FACA
1995
1996
1997 : TP USCA Bangui 2-0 Anges de Fatima
1998 : Anges de Fatima 3-0 AS Petroca
1999 : Réal Olympique Castel
2000 : Anges de Fatima 2-1 Olympic Real
2001 : Stade Centrafricain 2-1 AS Tempête Mocaf
2002 : not known
2003 : AS Tempête Mocaf 8-0 Ouham Pendé de Bozoum
2004 : TP USCA Bangui 2-0 Onze Carats de la Mambéré Kadéï
2005 : TP USCA Bangui defeated Lobaye Selection
2006 : not known
2007 : not known
2008 : Anges de Fatima 2-1 Stade Centrafricain
Coupe Barthélémy Boganda
2009 : Anges de Fatima 3-1 Stade Centrafricain
2010 : DFC8 1-0 Stade Centrafricain
2011 : AS Tempête Mocaf 2-1 (aet) DFC8
2012 : Final between Anges de Fatima and Olympic Real de Bangui
2013-2015 : not known
2016 : Anges de Fatima 1-0 Sica Sport
2017 : Anges de Fatima 1-0 Olympic Real de Bangui

References

Football competitions in the Central African Republic
National association football cups